Gerald T. Zeller (June 3, 1898 - November 10, 1968) was an American football Tailback who played one season for the Evansville Crimson Giants. He played four games.

Early life
Zeller was born on June 3, 1898 in Springfield, Ohio. He went to high school at Brazil (IN). He went to college at Illinois Fighting Illini football.

Professional career
In 1921, he played four games for the Evansville Crimson Giants. He scored one receiving touchdown. He wore number 10.

Later life
He died on November 10, 1968 in Columbus, Ohio.

References

1898 births
1968 deaths
Evansville Crimson Giants players